Trần Văn Vũ (born 30 May 1990) is a Vietnamese futsal player who plays as a defender (fixo) for Thái Sơn Nam.

International career

International goals

Club career honours

Domestic
All with Thái Sơn Nam
Vietnam Futsal League
Winners (6): 2013, 2014, 2016, 2017,2018,2019
Vietnam Futsal Cup
Winners (3): 2016,2017,2018

Continental

AFC Futsal Club Championship
Runner-up (1): 2018
Third place (3): 2015, 2017. 2019

International career

International honours
AFC Futsal Championship
Fourth place (1): 2016
AFF Futsal Championship
Runner-up (1): 2012
Third place (3): 2013, 2014, 2019

External links

 

1990 births
Living people
Futsal defenders
Vietnamese footballers
Association football defenders
V.League 1 players
Khanh Hoa FC players
People from Bình Phước Province